Benjamin Sulte (September 17, 1841 – August 6, 1923), baptized Olivier-Benjamin Vadeboncœur, was a Canadian journalist, writer, civil servant, and historian.

Born in Trois-Rivières, Lower Canada (now Quebec), to Benjamin Sulte dit Vadeboncœur, and Marie-Antoinette Lefebvre, Sulte had to leave school in 1851 as a consequence of the death of his father in 1847. He held a variety of jobs including working in a dry goods shop, as a clerk in a grocer's shop, as a bookkeeper for lumber merchants, as a paymaster on a steamship, and as an owner of a shop on a Grand Trunk Railway line.

In 1861, he joined the militia eventually becoming a sergeant-major. In 1866, he was appointed editor of Le Canada, a Conservative Ottawa newspaper. In 1867, he became a translator in the House of Commons of Canada. In 1870, he started working for the Department of Militia and Defence eventually becoming chief clerk in 1889. He retired in 1903. In 1871, he married Augustine Parent, daughter of Étienne Parent.

He wrote poems, songs, and was a historian.

In 1882 he was appointed a charter member of the Royal Society of Canada, and served as its president from 1904 to 1905. In 1916, he was awarded an honorary LL.D. by the University of Toronto.

Selected works
 Les Laurentiennes: poésies (Montréal, 1869)
 Histoire de la ville des Trois-Rivières et de ses environs (Montréal, 1870)
 Mélanges d'histoire et de littérature (Ottawa, 1876)
 Chants nouveaux (Ottawa, 1880)
 Histoire des Canadiens-français, 1608–1880: origine, histoire, religion, guerres, découvertes, colonisation, coutumes, vie domestique, sociale et politique, développement, avenir (8 volumes, 1882-1884)
 Mélanges Historiques : Études éparses et inédites (21 vols. Montreal 1918)

References

External links

 
 
 
 Gravures dans l'Histoire des Canadiens-Français de Benjamin Sulte, Web Robert DEROME, professeur honoraire d'histoire de l'art, Université du Québec à Montréal.

1841 births
1923 deaths
19th-century Canadian civil servants
20th-century Canadian historians
Canadian male non-fiction writers
Canadian male journalists
Journalists from Quebec
Writers from Quebec
Persons of National Historic Significance (Canada)
19th-century Canadian historians